Eileen Romanowski  (born 3 January 1984) is a retired Australian female volleyball and beach volleyball player, who played as a wing spiker.

She was part of the Australia women's national volleyball team at the 2002 FIVB Volleyball Women's World Championship in Germany. On club level she played with Mount Lofty. In 2007, she played beach volleyball with Becchara Palmer.

Clubs
 Mount Lofty (2002)

References

External links
 photosportnz
 

1984 births
Living people
Australian women's volleyball players
Australian women's beach volleyball players
Place of birth missing (living people)
Wing spikers
21st-century Australian women